Cincinnati CityBeat is an independent local arts and issues publication covering the Cincinnati, Ohio area. It has the second largest readership in the Cincinnati area behind The Cincinnati Enquirer daily newspaper.

History
CityBeat was founded in November 1994. It was backed by local entrepreneur Thomas Schiff and co-founded by John Fox, who left his editor position at Everybody's News (at that point Cincinnati's only print source for independent news) to start the paper. CityBeat has won numerous national, statewide and local journalism and design awards, most recently being named Best Weekly Paper in the state of Ohio in 2005 by the Society of Professional Journalists.

In 2012, CityBeat was acquired by SouthComm Communications. In 2018, it was sold to Euclid Media Group. https://www.crainscleveland.com/article/20180117/news/148856/euclid-media-group-acquires-cincinnati-alt-weekly

Affiliations
CityBeat is a member of the Association of Alternative Newsweeklies.

Notable people 

 Kathy Y. Wilson

References

https://www.crainscleveland.com/article/20180117/news/148856/euclid-media-group-acquires-cincinnati-alt-weekly

External links
 CityBeat
 ''CityBeats Best of Cincinnati
Ryan Greis, one of CityBeats award-winning Illustrators

Newspapers published in Cincinnati
Alternative weekly newspapers published in the United States